I-48 was the last of three Type C cruiser submarines of the C2 sub-class built for the Imperial Japanese Navy. Commissioned in September 1944, she operated as a kaiten manned suicide attack torpedo carrier during World War II and was sunk in January 1945.

Design and description
They displaced  surfaced and  submerged.

For surface running, the boats were powered by two  diesel engines, each driving one propeller shaft. When submerged each propeller was driven by a  electric motor. They could reach  on the surface and  underwater.

The boats were armed with eight internal bow  torpedo tubes and carried a total of 20 torpedoes. They were also armed with a single /40 deck gun and two single or twin mounts for  Type 96 anti-aircraft guns. They were equipped to carry one Type A midget submarine aft of the conning tower.

Construction and commissioning

Ordered under the Rapid Naval Armaments Supplement Programme and built by the Sasebo Naval Arsenal at Sasebo, Japan, I-48 was laid down on 19 June 1943 with the name Submarine No. 378. On 12 December 1943 she was numbered I-48 and Launched. She was completed and commissioned on 5 September 1944.

Service history

Upon commissioning, I-48 was attached to the Yokosuka Naval District and assigned to Submarine Squadron 11 in the 6th Fleet. She was configured to carry four kaiten manned suicide attack torpedoes on her after deck, two of them with access tubes that allowed their pilots to enter them while she was submerged. On 7 December 1944 she was reassigned to Submarine Division 15 in the 6th Fleet, and on 8 December she was assigned to the Kongo ("Steel") kaiten unit.

I-48 completed work-ups in the Seto Inland Sea on 26 December 1944 and proceeded to the naval base at Otsujima. She embarked her kaitens and their pilots there, and on 9 January 1945 became the last submarine of the Kongo unit to get underway for the U.S. naval base at Ulithi Atoll in the Caroline Islands to participate in a kaiten attack on the U.S. fleet there scheduled for 21 January 1945. The Japanese never heard from her again.

When the plane tried to ascertain I-48′s nationality, she submerged, and the Mariner attacked her with two depth charges and a Mark 24 "Fido" acoustic homing torpedo. She survived, but aborted her kaiten attack on the anchorage.

After the group made no contact with I-48, the group expanded its search all the way to Yap on 22 January 1945.

Corbesier closed the range and I-48 submerged. Corbesier picked up sonar contact on I-48 at 03:36 and fired a Hedgehog salvo that missed. Conklin and Raby also arrived on the scene. Corbesier fired five more Hedgehog salvoes without scoring any hits, then lost contact.

Corbesier regained contact on I-48 at 09:02 and fired another Hedgehog salvo, which missed. Corbesier again gained sound contact at 09:12, but lost it before she could attack again. Conklin observed huge air bubbles rising to the surface, soon followed by oil, wreckage, and large quantities of human remains.

The Japanese 6th Fleet attempted to contact I-48 on 31 January 1945, ordering her to proceed to Kure, Japan. She did not acknowledge the order. She was stricken from the Navy list on 10 May 1945.

Notes

References
 

1943 ships
World War II submarines of Japan
Japanese submarines lost during World War II
Ships built by Sasebo Naval Arsenal
Type C2 submarines
Maritime incidents in January 1945
World War II shipwrecks in the Philippine Sea
World War II shipwrecks in the Pacific Ocean
Ships lost with all hands
Submarines sunk by United States warships